Chalchicomula de Sesma Municipality is a municipality in Puebla in south-eastern Mexico.

The seat is Ciudad Serdán.

Etymology
The name of the municipality is of Nahuatl origin and comes from the words chalchihuitl, meaning "turquoise," and xomulli, loosely translated as "hollow" or "nook".

References

Municipalities of Puebla